Mount Steamer  is a mountain in Emu Vale in the Scenic Rim Region, Queensland, Australia.

It marks the intersection between the Main Range and The Steamer Range. Walking to the summit is a tough undertaking from any of its spurs.

History 

References

See also

List of mountains in Australia

Steamer
Main Range National Park